Evan Fong (born 31 May 1992), known online as VanossGaming (or simply Vanoss), is a Canadian internet personality, video game commentator, music producer, and DJ. He posts montage-style videos on YouTube of him and other creators playing various video games, such as Grand Theft Auto V and Garry's Mod. Aside from this, he produces music and performs as a DJ under the name Rynx, and served as a creative director for the video game Dead Realm, and as a voice actor for the YouTube Premium series Paranormal Action Squad and the animated series Alpha Betas.

Biography 
Fong was born on 31 May 1992 and raised in Toronto, Ontario. Fong is of Asian descent, his mother being Korean, and father Chinese. Fong graduated from Richmond Hill High School and studied economics in college, but he later dropped out in his second year to focus on his YouTube channel as a full-time commitment. Fong claimed that his parents were initially concerned that he was neglecting his studies in favor of producing content for his YouTube channel, admitting that "Even though there's a lot of potential for somebody starting a YouTube channel it's obviously not a guaranteed path.".

During his early years on YouTube, he met several other creators who would eventually become frequently featured in his videos. His channel achieved popularity soon after, and by 2014 it had surpassed 10 million subscribers. In the same year, he appeared at PAX East and signed a contract with Jetpak. His logo, an owl in the shape of the letter "V", modeled after his character in Grand Theft Auto V, is one of his most recognizable symbols.

Fong claimed that he was not introduced to video games at a young age, but that he played games "here and there" which included children's adventure and puzzle titles such as Freddi Fish and Pajama Sam.

Outside of his YouTube career, Fong continues to play ice hockey recreationally, plays airsoft or other tournaments, and also plays the guitar as another hobby.

On 30 April 2015, Fong announced on Twitter that he had signed with Jetpak, a multi-channel network founded by Adam Montoya and Tom Cassell.
	
On 26 November 2015, Fong announced that he was releasing a new logo for the VanossGaming brand. He released the logo later that day along with limited edition merchandise released the day after. The logo was a white minimalistic design of an owl on a black background. There is also a diagonal cut through the design, creating a black letter "V". The owl design represented the owl mask on Fong's character model in Grand Theft Auto Online.

Fong's content has earned him two award nominations, including a Shorty Award for Tech and Innovation, under the category of Gaming. He has been recognized as a central figure in the subculture of video game commentary, with publications attributing his massive popularity to his sense of authenticity. As of April 2020, Fong's channel has over 12 billion views and 25.0 million subscribers, making it the 95th most subscribed channel on YouTube.

Name 
Fong created the VanossGaming channel on YouTube on 15 September 2011. The name "Vanoss" comes from VANOS, a variable valve timing system produced by German automobile company BMW; Fong's father used the alias "vanoss62" (which referred to the S62 engine used in the E39 generation BMW M5) on the PlayStation 3, which his son later adopted for his own.

YouTube channel

In January 2015, Fong began to receive mainstream media attention as he approached 11 million subscribers and a ranking within the top 25 most subscribed channels on YouTube, with commentators identifying him as a central figure in the growing video game commentary subculture. Speaking at the time, he suggested that his success could be credited to the fact that "Viewers really like the authentic type of content from regular people just playing games because they can relate to that". In March 2015, he appeared on the "YouTube Gaming Evolution" panel at PAX East in Boston, Massachusetts, alongside collaborators I Am Wildcat, Lui Calibre, and Mini Ladd.

Format
The majority of VanossGaming videos take the format of a montage or compilation, featuring various clips from a particular game session, usually featuring other video game commentators. The Canadian Press described "a typical Vanoss video" as one that features "Vanoss and a group of friends chatting, laughing and making jokes over gameplay from popular titles such as Grand Theft Auto V or Call of Duty: World at War."

Other projects

Dead Realm
On 25 July 2015, Fong announced that he had been working on a game called Dead Realm for "the last six or seven months" as a creative director, alongside collaborators David Nagle (Daithi De Nogla), Brian Hanby (The Terroriser), Craig "Mini Ladd" Thompson, and Tom "Syndicate". It was released via Steam as an early release on 30 July 2015; it was later fully released on May 23, 2017. However, on August 27, 2020; after 3 years since its official release, 3BLACKDOT; the publisher of that game, ended its support amidst negative reviews the game received around the time after its official release, shutting down all of its servers, effectively discontinuing the game.

Paranormal Action Squad
On 2 November 2016, Fong, Adam Montoya, and Scott Robinson announced that a computer-animated series of videos entitled Paranormal Action Squad starring the three and written by Michael Rowe would air on YouTube Red, beginning on November 24.

Alpha Betas
On June 25, 2020, Fong announced that another computer animated series titled Alpha Betas is in production starring Fong, Brian "Terroriser" Hanby, Marcel "BasicallyIDoWrk" Cunningham and Tyler "WILDCAT" Wine, who are also credited as executive producers. It is created by Chris Bruno and David Howard Lee with production led by 3BlackDot and Starburns Industries. The pilot episode premiered on Fong's channel on March 13, 2021 and gained over 5 million views as June 2021. While they got offers from many networks, none of them were willing to give the showrunners the creative freedom, which led them to launch a Kickstarter on July 20, 2021. On October 18, 2022, it was announced new episodes of Alpha Betas would premiere on October 31, 2022 on the Alpha Betas YouTube channel.

Music career 

On 25 August 2017, Fong released a remix of "U-Rite" by hip-hop group They under the name Rynx. Fong released his debut single "Want You" featuring Miranda Glory on 12 December 2017 under his record label, Avant Garden.

On 18 April 2018, Fong released the official music video for "Want You". On June 27, he released the music video for his second single "I'm Alright" featuring Jimi Ono.

On August 15, he released a remix of the Alison Wonderland song, “Cry.”

On 16 November 2018, he released a remix of the Gallant song “Doesn’t Matter.” On 19 December 2018, he and Jaykode released a remix of the Sasha Sloan song “Normal.”

On 16 January 2019, he released his third single “Hold On” featuring Drew Love.

On 8 March 2019, he released a remix of the Olivia O'Brien song, “Love Myself”, and on 3 May 2019, he released a remix of “Contra La Pared” by Jamaican singer Sean Paul and Colombian singer J Balvin.

His fourth single “Read my Mind” featuring Mainland was released on 22 May 2019. His fifth single, “Club Poor”, with Tiny Meat Gang, was released on 10 July 2019.

His sixth single "All For You" featuring Kiesza was released on 31 July 2019. On 17 September 2019, he announced on his Instagram account that he is going to be releasing his debut project, In Pieces, in October. On the same day, he announced that he would be going on tour in October and November 2019 in the United States and Canada, and possibly releasing merchandise in the tour. On October 15, Rynx stated on Twitter that "He was ruining his health" and that he wanted his set to be the best for his tour for his fans. He also stated he wanted "to feel something while on the stage that'll make it all worth it." On November 5, he announced on YouTube that his tour was delayed (except the San Francisco trip) until February.

In Pieces was released in 25 October 2019.

Discography

Studio albums

Remix albums

Singles

Remixes

Award nominations

References

External links

1992 births
Canadian people of Chinese descent
Canadian people of Korean descent
Canadian YouTubers
Living people
Video game commentators
YouTube channels launched in 2011
Gaming YouTubers
YouTube channels
21st-century Canadian male musicians
Musicians from Toronto